Ludolf of Tournai or Letholdus was the first Christian knight over the walls of Jerusalem during the siege of Jerusalem of 1099, essentially ending the First Crusade, according to a contemporary account by an unknown eyewitness. It is said that when the Muslims saw Ludolf emerge over the walls, many of them began to retreat further into Jerusalem.

See also
 Tancred, Prince of Galilee - alternative claimant of "the first Christian knight over the walls of Jerusalem "

References 

Christians of the First Crusade
Medieval knights